EJ may refer to:

Businesses and brands
 EJ (company), formerly East Jordan Iron Works
 eJay, a music software program 
 New England Airlines (IATA code EJ)
 E & J Gallo Winery
 Holden EJ, an early Holden car
 Subaru EJ engine series, manufactured by Subaru

Media
 Encyclopaedia Judaica
 The Economic Journal, the journal of the Royal Economic Society
 Edmonton Journal
 English Journal, the official publication of the Secondary Education section of the American National Council of Teachers of English

Other uses
 East Jerusalem
 Electronic journalism, an old name for electronic news gathering
 Electro jockey, an individual who uses computers and MIDI devices to mix music as opposed to using records or CDs
 Environmental justice
 Exajoule (EJ), an SI unit of energy equal to 1018 joules
 External jugular vein
 Expansion joint, in architecture and structural mechanics
E. J. (given name), a page for people with the given name "E. J."